Massive Addictive (stylized in all caps) is the third studio album by Swedish heavy metal band Amaranthe. It is also the first album with Henrik Englund on harsh vocals, replacing former growling vocalist Andy Solveström, who left the band in 2013.

Track listing

Personnel

Amaranthe
Jake E – clean vocals (male)
Elize Ryd – clean vocals (female)
Olof Mörck – guitars, keyboards, programming
Johan Andreassen – bass
Morten Løwe Sørensen – drums
Henrik Englund – harsh vocals

Production
Jacob Hansen – production, engineering, mixing, mastering
Olof Mörck – co-production, mixing
Jake E – mixing

Guest musicians
Elias Holmlid – keyboards on "Over and Done"
Michael Vahl – additional vocals on "An Ordinary Abnormality"

Miscellaneous
Gustavo Sazes – artwork, cover art
Jonas Haagensen – studio assistant
Daniel Antonsson (Dimension Zero, ex-Dark Tranquillity, ex-Soilwork) – recording (guitars)
Patric Ullaeus – photography

Charts

References 

2014 albums
Amaranthe albums
Spinefarm Records albums
Albums produced by Jacob Hansen